Vankalai Sanctuary is located in the northwest of Sri Lanka in the District of Mannar. This site covers an area of 4,839 ha.

See also
 Muthurajawela wetlands

References

2010 establishments in Sri Lanka
Important Bird Areas of Sri Lanka
Nanaddan DS Division
Protected areas established in 2010
Protected areas in Northern Province, Sri Lanka
Wildlife sanctuaries of Sri Lanka